The electoral district of West Devon was a single-member electoral district of the Tasmanian House of Assembly. It was based in the region surrounding the northern coastal town of Devonport.

The seat was created in a redistribution ahead of the 1871 election from part of the Devon electorate, and was abolished when the Tasmanian parliament adopted the Hare-Clark electoral model in 1909.

Members for West Devon

References
 
 
 Parliament of Tasmania (2006). The Parliament of Tasmania from 1956

Devon West